San Luis de Palenque Airport  is an airport serving the town of San Luis de Palenque, in Casanare Department of Colombia. The runway is southeast, adjacent to the town.

See also

Transport in Colombia
List of airports in Colombia

References

External links
OpenStreetMap - San Luis de Palenque
OurAirports - San Luis de Palenque
FallinRain - San Luis de Paleque Airport

Airports in Colombia